Charkaoui (in Arabic شرقاوي or الشرقاوي) is a surname. Notable people with the surname include:

 Adil Charkaoui (born 1974), Morocco-born Canadian citizen 
 Charkaoui v Canada (Minister of Citizenship and Immigration), a landmark decision of the Supreme Court of Canada 
 Taib Charkaoui (also Taib Cherkaoui - born 1949), Minister of Interior of Morocco between 2010 and 2012

See also
Cherkaoui, a variant transliteration of Charkaoui